Satya (nominative satyam) is a central concept in Indian religions that loosely translates into English as "Truth".

Satya, Sathya, Satyam or Sathyam may refer to:

Film and television 
 Satyam (1976 film), a Tamil language film, starring Sivaji Ganesan & Jayachitra
 Sathyam (1980 film), a 1980 Malayalam film starring Sreenath and Shanthi Krishna
 Sathya (1988 film), a 1988 Tamil language film, starring Kamal Haasan
 Satya (1998 film), a 1998 Hindi film directed by Ram Gopal Varma
 Satyam (2003 film), a 2003 Telugu film directed by Surya Kiran, starring Sumanth and Genelia D'Souza
 Sathyam (2004 film), a 2004 Malayalam film starring Prithviraj and Priyamani
 Satyam (2008 film), a Tamil language film
 Sathya (2010 film), an Indian Kannada romance drama film
 Sathya (2017 Tamil film), an Indian Tamil crime thriller
 Satya (2017 film), an Indian Bhojpuri action-romance-drama
 Sathya (2017 Malayalam film), an Indian Malayalam action thriller
 Sathya (TV series), a Tamil soap opera which premiered in 2019

Religion 
 Nagnajiti, a queen-consort of Hindu god Krishna
 Sacca, Theravada Pali term
 Satya Mahima Dharma, religious tradition in Hinduism in India
 Satya Pir, belief system created by the fusion of Islam and local religions in Bengal
 Satya Yuga, Era of Truth in Hinduism

Other 
 Satya (magazine), an American animal rights magazine
 Satya Wacana Christian University, private university located in Salatiga, Central Java, Indonesia
 Mahindra Satyam, a defunct Indian computer services company, formerly known as Satyam Computer Services

People

People with the surname
 Habel Satya (born 1987), Indonesian footballer
 Tatineni Satya, Indian film maker

People with the given name
 Satya Narayana Charka, Indian-American dancer, teacher, and choreographer
 Satya Pal Jain (born 1952), Indian politician from Punjab
 Satya Krishnan, Indian actress
 Satya Nadella (born 1967), Indian-American business executive, CEO of Microsoft
 Satya Nandan,  Fiji diplomat and lawyer
 Satyam Patel (1932–2005), Indian social worker and activist
 Satya Prabhakar (born 1963), Indian-American entrepreneur, engineer and writer
 Satya Prakash (born 1929),  Indian physicist
 Sathya (Tamil actor), Indian Tamil actor
 Satya (Telugu actor), Indian Telugu actor
 Satyam Rajesh, Indian Telugu actor and comedian
 Satyam Sankaramanchi (1937–1987), Indian Telugu writer
 Satya Sarkar, Indian cricketer
 Satya Vrat Shastri (born 1930), Indian Sanskrit scholar, writer, grammarian and poet

See also 
 Satyam (surname)
 Satyameva Jayate, "truth alone triumphs", Indian national motto